The 2011 Seguros Bolívar Open Pereira was a professional tennis tournament played on Hard courts. It was part of the 2011 ATP Challenger Tour. It took place in Pereira, Colombia between 4 and 10 April 2011.

ATP entrants

Seeds

Rankings are as of March 21, 2011.

Other entrants
The following players received wildcards into the singles main draw:
  Nicolás Barrientos
  Manuel Barros
  Sebastián López
  Eduardo Struvay

The following players received entry from the qualifying draw:
  Júlio César Campozano
  Guillermo Durán
  Marco Trungelliti
  Denis Zivkovic

Champions

Singles

 Paolo Lorenzi def.  Rogério Dutra da Silva, 7–5, 6–2

Doubles

 Marcel Felder /  Carlos Salamanca def.  Alejandro Falla /  Eduardo Struvay, 7–6(5), 6–4

References
Official website of Seguros Bolívar Tennis
ITF search
ATP official site

Seguros Bolivar Open Pereira
Tennis tournaments in Colombia
Seguros Bolívar Open Pereira
2011 in Colombian tennis